Cireungas Station (CRG) is a class III railway station located in Bencoy, Cireunghas, Sukabumi Regency. The station, which is located at an altitude of +587 m, is included in the Bandung Operational Area II and is a railway station located at the most eastern and southern of Sukabumi Regency.

Services
The following is a list of train services at the Cireungas Station.

Passenger services
 Economy class
 Siliwangi, towards  and towards

References

External links
 

Sukabumi Regency
Railway stations in West Java
Railway stations opened in 1883